The Gatineau River is a river in western Quebec, Canada, which rises in lakes north of the Baskatong Reservoir and flows south to join the Ottawa River at the city of Gatineau, Quebec.

Geography 
The geography of the area was altered with the construction of the Baskatong Reservoir, and it is still possible to travel upstream on the Gatineau and reach a point where a small portage leads to the headwaters of the Ottawa River. The Ottawa River then flows northwest and turns south where it eventually flows more easterly and connects with the Gatineau.

The river flows through the communities of:
 Maniwaki
 Gracefield
 Low
 Wakefield
 Chelsea
 Cantley
 Gatineau

A covered wooden bridge over the river at Wakefield, built in 1915, was destroyed by arson in 1984, but has been rebuilt.

History

Exploration and naming 

This river was an important transportation corridor for native people of the region and early explorers. On June 4, 1613, Samuel de Champlain passed here while travelling on the Ottawa River to L'Isle-aux-Allumettes.

He noted this "river coming from the north" but did not give its name.

In 1783, in a report to the governor Frederick Haldimand, lieutenant David Jones called the river by the name "River Lettinoe". According to Lucien Brault (History of Pointe-Gatineau, 1948), this would be the first written reference to the name Gatineau. On the charts of his account from 1830, but recalling events from the beginning of the 19th century, the traveller and fur trader Jean-Baptiste Perrault called the river "nàgàtinong" or "àgatinung".

On a plan of the Rideau Canal, drawn by lieutenant-colonel John By in 1831, the river is called "Gatteno". Finally, "R. Gatineau" appears on the chart of William Henderson in 1831, and on the one of Thomas Guesses, in 1861.

This name recollects the memory of a fur trader from the 17th century, Nicolas Gatineau or Gastineau. Inhabitant of Trois-Rivières, he had traded near a river located between the Ottawa and Saint-Maurice Rivers, which was then customarily called river of Gatineau. But according to Raymond Douville, at the end of the 17th century Louis (1674−1750) and Jean-Baptiste (1671−1750), sons of Nicolas, established a trading post, or just a supply post, on a point located at the mouth of the river, site of the future Point-Gatineau. Therefore, the toponym given to the river is more likely a credit to the Gatineau sons than to Nicolas.  The river's name may also be a French derivation of an Anishinaabe word for the river.

Economic uses 

From the 19th century until 1991, the river was used to transport logs to sawmills near the mouth of the river. Philemon Wright and his descendants played an important role in the development of the lumber industry in the Gatineau valley. In more recent times, with declining quality in the forests of the region, logs were used for pulp and paper.

The river has been extensively dammed and is an important source of hydroelectric power. In 1925, three hydroelectric dams were constructed along the lower Gatineau River, making them one of the biggest economic and industrial projects in the region's history. These are now known today as the Paugan, Chelsea and Rapides-Farmers Hydroelectric Stations (Centrale Paugan, Centrale Chelsea and Centrale Rapides-Farmers). The stations are located within the municipalities of Low, Cantley and Gatineau.

The Hull–Chelsea–Wakefield Railway, a tourist steam train, followed a route up the Gatineau valley to Wakefield.

In 1915, Canadian artist and member of the Group of Seven J. E. H. MacDonald would depict logging operations on the river is his painting, Logs on the Gatineau.

Flooding 
In the spring of 1974, there was extensive flooding along the Gatineau.

Tributaries
Major tributaries of the Gatineau River in upstream order are:

See also
 
 List of Quebec rivers

References

External links

 Ottawa-Gatineau Watershed Atlas
 Gatineau River
 Festival d'eau vive de la Haute-Gatineau - A festival dedicated to the preservation of rivers.

Rivers of Outaouais
Hydro-Québec
Geography of Gatineau